wxHaskell is a portable and native GUI library for Haskell, built on wxWidgets. It is often used by those wanting to develop a GUI with a functional language.

Applications

High-level GUI libraries built on top of wxHaskell 
wxHaskell is a middle-level GUI library. Several experimental high-level GUI library approaches are implemented on top of wxHaskell:
 Reactive-banana
 FunctionalForms
 wxFruit
 Phooey
In contrast, the high-level GUI libraries FG and Grapefruit are implemented on top of the middle-level Gtk2Hs, which is based on GTK2.

All of these high-level libraries are experimental, using advanced mathematical concepts in their approach (see arrows in functional programming).

Notes

External links

 Web page of the wxHaskell project
 The 2004 ICFP Programming Contest. The winning entry by the team Dunkosmiloolump was written in Haskell and wxHaskell.
 wxHaskell, A Portable and Concise GUI Library for Haskell

WxWidgets
Free computer libraries
X-based libraries